Typhoon Ellen, known in the Philippines as Typhoon Herming, was considered the worst typhoon to hit China since 1979. Typhoon Ellen was first noted as a tropical disturbance east of the International Date Line on August 26, 1983, and became a tropical storm soon after crossing the dateline on the morning of August 29. Initially, strong wind shear inhibited development over the next five days, and the cyclone began to track south of west. On September 2, conditions aloft finally improved and the cyclone strengthened into a typhoon on September 4 as it tracked west-northwest. Approaching Luzon late on September 5, Ellen intensified rapidly into a strong typhoon with winds of  before interaction with Luzon began to weaken the cyclone. Its final landfall was at Portuguese Macau on the morning of September 9 as a minimal typhoon. The next day, Ellen ceased to exist.

Despite passing north of the Philippines, the storm killed three and left 15 persons injured. Damage in the country totaled $680,000 (1983 USD). While passing near British Hong Kong, 50,000 people lost electrical services. Around 200 homes were destroyed; a total 2,000 people lost their homes, 1,600 of whom sought shelter. Throughout the city, eight people perished and 339 were hurt, including 120 seriously. Ellen spawned the second tornado ever recorded in Hong Kong, and the first ever recorded during a typhoon. Elsewhere, in Portuguese Macau, little damage was reported. Offshore, 40 crew members were rescued in a shipwreck. In a separate incident, eight people were lost at sea. Furthermore, ten Taiwan fishing boats capsized in the South China Sea, resulting in 48 fishermen missing, though 103 persons also survived. Overall, damage totaled $79 million and 23 people died.

Meteorological history

The disturbance crossed the dateline two days later and a Tropical Cyclone Formation Alert (TCFA) was subsequently issued. At 0000 UTC on August 29, the Joint Typhoon Warning Center (JTWC) first classified the system. Initially, the storm did not develop significantly due to strong wind shear caused by an intense high pressure area north of the cyclone. This also caused Ellen to turn west-southwest. On August 31, however, the Japan Meteorological Agency (JMA) started warning on the system, declaring it a tropical storm. On September 2, the storm began to turn west-northwest and environmental conditions became much more favorable for development. The JMA upgraded Ellen into a severe tropical storm early the following morning. Later on September 3, the Philippine Atmospheric, Geophysical and Astronomical Services Administration (PASAGA) started tracking the storm and assigned it with the local name Herming. At 1200 UTC, the JTWC upgraded Ellen into a typhoon, though the JMA did not follow suit until early on September 4.

After maintaining this intensity for 12 hours, Ellen deepened slightly that evening, though the JTWC suggests that the storm intensified into a Category 2 hurricane on the United States Saffir-Simpson Hurricane Wind Scale.

Ellen's peak intensity was short-lived; Typhoon Ellen soon began to weaken steadily as it moved through the Luzon Straits while interacting with Luzon. At that time, the JTWC noted that Ellen's winds were equivalent to a Category 2 hurricane. However, the JMA suggests that the weakening trend leveled off late on September 7. The next day, PASAGA ceased monitoring the system as it was no longer a threat to the Philippines. According to the JMA, the system moved ashore near Macao at 0000 UTC on September 9 as an  typhoon, though the JTWC estimates that the storm was a little weaker at landfall. Ellen dissipated rapidly overland, and the JTWC downgraded Ellen into a tropical depression 12 hours later. However, the JMA kept watching the system until 0600 UTC on September 10.

Preparations and impact

Due to the storm's threat to Hong Kong, a no. 10 hurricane signal was issued. Across Hong Kong, schools and government offices were ordered to be closed and 250 shelters were opened. In addition, most shops and restaurants as well as all financial markets were closed.

Despite passing north of the Philippines, the storm killed three and 15 people sustained injuries. Damage in the country totaled $680,000. A total of 605 dwellings were damaged, excluding 105 that were destroyed. Rainfall totaled  at Hong Kong's Royal Observatory (RO or ROHK, now HKO). Twenty-two ships were wrecked, including a 21,000-ton freighter, forcing the rescue of all 40 crew members. A  yacht Osprey carried nine people, eight of which were lost and presumed dead. Several minor collisions were reported between ships. Along the coastal province Guandong in southern China, communications and public services were disrupted. Ferry services from Hong Kong to Macao were suspended. On September 8, ten Taiwan fishing boats capsized in the South China Sea; consequently, 48 fishermen were missing, though 103 persons survived and later took refuge at Pratas Island, Taiwan (ROC).

In Hong Kong, 50,000 people lost power. About 200 houses were destroyed. More than 2,000 people were left homeless; 1,600 of the homeless sought emergency shelter. Flights to the Kai Tak Airport were cancelled as the airport was closed for 12 hours. Large areas of farmland were damaged. Throughout the city, eight people perished, including a girl that was crushed by a falling cabinet. Two sisters were killed via a landslide while a fireman died when trying to rescue someone. Additionally, 339 people were injured, including 120 seriously. Forty-five people were injured due to flying glass and failing objects. Typhoon Ellen also spawned the second tornado ever recorded in Hong Kong, and the first ever recorded during the passage of a typhoon. According to the HKO, Ellen was Hong Kong's worst typhoon since Typhoon Hope of 1979.

In nearby Macao, minor property damage was reported and 15 people were initially rendered as missing. However, by October 13, 10 people remained missing and were then presumed dead. In all, damage totaled $79 million (1983 USD) and 20 people were killed due to Typhoon Ellen in mainland China.

See also

Typhoon Ora (1972)
Typhoon Mangkhut - a typhoon in 2018, that followed the same track as Ellen.

References

Typhoons in China
1983 Pacific typhoon season
Typhoons
1983 in China
Ellen